McCrindle is a surname. Notable people with the surname include:

Alex McCrindle (1911–1990), Scottish actor
Bob McCrindle (1869–?), Scottish footballer
John Watson McCrindle (1825-1913), English philologist and Classical scholar 
Robert McCrindle (1929–1998), English politician